Behave Yourself! is a 1951 American comedy directed and cowritten by George Beck, starring Farley Granger and Shelley Winters and released by RKO Radio Pictures.

Plot
Mild mannered young CPA Bill Denny forgets about his and his wife Kate's second anniversary until the last minute, when a small dog starts to follow him. After Kate mistakes the dog for her present, mayhem ensues, and Bill is chased by police, smugglers, counterfeiters and murderers while being harassed by his mother-in-law.

Cast
 Farley Granger as William Calhoun 'Bill' Denny
 Shelley Winters as Kate Denny
 William Demarest as Officer O'Ryan
 Francis L. Sullivan as Fat Freddy
 Margalo Gillmore as Mother
 Lon Chaney Jr. as Pinky
 Hans Conried as Gillie the Blade
 Elisha Cook Jr. as Albert Jonas
 Glenn Anders as Pete the Pusher
 Allen Jenkins as Plainclothesman
 Sheldon Leonard as Shortwave Bert
 Marvin Kaplan as Max the Umbrella
 Archie as himself
 Henry Corden as Numi

Production
The film was written in four days and was originally intended to be a vehicle for Cary Grant.

Soundtrack
 "Behave Yourself!" (By Lew Spence and Buddy Ebsen)

References

External links

 
 
 
 
 

1951 films
American crime comedy films
American black-and-white films
1950s screwball comedy films
RKO Pictures films
1950s crime comedy films
American screwball comedy films
Films scored by Leigh Harline
1951 comedy films
1950s English-language films
1950s American films